0music is the second album produced with Melomics technology. While the first one (Iamus' album) is a compilation of contemporary pieces fully composed by Iamus, 0music compiles pieces of popular genres, composed and interpreted without any human intervention by Melomics109, a computer cluster hosted at the University of Malaga. The pieces in this album, and all the production of Melomics109, is distributed under CC0 licensing, and it is available in audible and editable (MIDI) formats.

The album was launched during a one-day symposium held in Malaga on July 21, 2014.

Track listing

See also
 1 the Road

External links
Melomics Playlist
0music in YouTube

References

2012 albums
Artificial intelligence art
Music technology
Spanish Supercomputing Network